An Imperial Crown is a crown used for the coronation of emperors.

Design 

Crowns in Europe during the Middle Ages varied in design:

During the Middle Ages the crowns worn by English kings had been described as both closed (or arched) and open designs. This was in contrast with kings of France who always wore an open crown. However, there is academic debate on how often closed crowns were used in England during this period, as the first unequivocal use of the closed crown was by Henry IV of England at his coronation on 13 October 1399. However his effigy on his tomb in Canterbury Cathedral wears an open crown, so the link in England between the style of the crown and its representation as that worn by a king and an emperor was not established.  The use of a closed crown may have been adopted by the English as a way of distinguishing the English crown from the French crown, but it also had other meanings to some. For example, Henry V of England wore a helmet-crown of the arched type at the Battle of Agincourt which the French knight St. Remy commented was "like the imperial crown".

The association of the closed crown with imperial crowns was already established in Continental Europe by  the late 14th century, for example the florins minted for Charles IV, Holy Roman Emperor) sometimes show him with a closed crown (though on the commoner variety, the crown is open). A miniature picture in the Chronica Aulae Regiae written in the great abbey outside Prague depicts his mother Elizabeth, a queen of Bohemia, wearing an open crown, while his two wives, who had imperial titles, have closed ones.

During the machinations that surrounded the introduction of the imperial crown under Henry VIII (see the section below Legal usage), the closed crown, became associated as a symbolic representation of the English Crown as an imperial crown, and has remained so until this day.

Types of Imperial crowns

Roman Imperial Crowns

Byzantine Imperial Crowns

Imperial Crowns with Mitre

Imperial Crowns with single arch and deployable mitre

Imperial Crowns with single arch and attached mitre

Imperial Crowns with high arches

Ottoman Imperial Crowns

Prussian-German Imperial Crowns

Napoleonic Imperial Crowns

Imperial crowns based on the design of European royal crowns

Other Imperial Crowns without European origin or influence

Heraldic Imperial Crowns 
A list of prominent examples of depictions of imperial crowns displayed atop heraldic achievements or as heraldic charge includes:

Legal usage

Because Pope Clement VII would not grant Henry VIII of England an annulment of his marriage to Catherine of Aragon, the English Parliament passed the Act in Restraint of Appeals (1533) in which it was explicitly stated that
Where by divers sundry old authentic histories and chronicles it is manifestly declared and expressed that this realm of England is an empire, and so hath been accepted in the world, governed by one supreme head and king, having the dignity and royal estate of the imperial crown of the same.
The next year the Act of Supremacy (1534) explicitly tied the headship of the church to the imperial crown:
The only supreme head in earth of the Church of England called Anglicana Ecclesia, and shall have and enjoy annexed and united to the imperial crown of this realm.

During the reign of Mary I the First Act of Supremacy was annulled, but during the reign of Elizabeth I the Second Act of Supremacy, with similar wording to the First Act, was passed in 1559. During the English Interregnum the laws were annulled, but the acts which caused the laws to be in abeyance were themselves, deemed to be null and void by the Parliaments of the English Restoration, so by act of Parliament The Crown of England and (later the British and UK crowns) are imperial crowns.

See also
 Consort crown
 Coronation crown
 Royal crown
 State crown

Footnotes

References

Monarchy
Crowns (headgear)
State ritual and ceremonies
Byzantine regalia